Claus Krag (born April 21, 1943) is a Norwegian educator, historian, and writer. He is a noted specialist in Old Norse philology and medieval Norwegian history. Krag  earned his Cand.philol. in 1969. He is Professor of History at Telemark University College.

Selected works
Motstandsbestemmelsene i Frostatingsloven (1969)
Artikler i utvalg for historiestudiet : Roma og middelalder (1975)
By og imperium : Romas historie fra republikk til keiserdømme : tekst, kilder og oppgaver (1977)
Introduksjon til bosetningshistorien (1980)
Oldtidens historie ca. 700 f.Kr. - 600 e.Kr. Første del : Hellas (1983)
Skikkethet og arv i tronfølgeloven av 1163 (1983)
Perspektiv på tidlig middelalder (1983)
Europa i middelalderen : hovedlinjer i den politiske utvikling ca. 500-1300 (1985)
 Ynglingatal og Ynglingesaga- en studie i historiske kilder (1991)
 Vikingtid og rikssamling 800-1130 (Aschehoug's History of Norway, 2) (Oslo, 1995)
 Kirkens forkynnelse i tidlig middelalder og nordmennenes kristendom (1995)
 Norges historie fram til 1319 (Oslo, 2000)
 Sverre: Norges største middelalderkonge (2003)

References

External links
 Claus Krag (Library Database)  
Claus Krag  (Universitetsforlaget)

1943 births
Living people
20th-century Norwegian historians
Norwegian male writers
Old Norse studies scholars
Academic staff of Telemark University College
Writers from Oslo